J. T. Petty (born February 28, 1977) is an American filmmaker and video game writer. Petty's film and short novels contain elements of the horror genre.  As writer for the Ubisoft video games Tom Clancy's Splinter Cell and its sequel Tom Clancy's Splinter Cell: Pandora Tomorrow, Petty created the character Sam Fisher. He also wrote the survival horror games Outlast and Outlast 2.

Filmography

Bibliography
Novels
 2005: Clemency Pogue: Fairy Killer, Simon & Schuster, 
 2006: Clemency Pogue: The Hobgoblin Proxy, Simon & Schuster, 
 2006: The Squampkin Patch, Simon & Schuster, 
 2007: The Scrivener Bees, Simon & Schuster, 
 2012: Bloody Chester, First Second, 
 2014: The Rise of Aurora West, (with Paul Pope) First Second, 
 2015: The Fall of the House of West, (with Paul Pope) First Second, 

Comic books
 2013: Brooklyn Animal Control, IDW Publishing
 2016: Outlast: The Murkoff Account

Video games
 2001: Batman: Vengeance
 2002: Tom Clancy's Splinter Cell
 2004: Tom Clancy's Splinter Cell: Pandora Tomorrow
 2005: Batman Begins
 2011: Homefront
 2013: Outlast
 2014: Outlast: Whistleblower
 2014: The Walking Dead: Season Two
 2015: Minecraft: Story Mode
 2017: Outlast 2

References

External links
  J. T. Petty at Simon & Schuster
 

Living people
1977 births
Writers from Raleigh, North Carolina
Video game writers
American male writers
Film directors from North Carolina